"Forgive Me" is a song by British singer Leona Lewis featured on the North American version and on the international deluxe edition of her debut album Spirit (2008). Musically, "Forgive Me" is a pop track with dance influences, written in A minor. The lyrics tell the story of a girl who has found a new love and asks her old one for forgiveness. The song was written by Aliaune "Akon" Thiam, Claude Kelly and Giorgio Tuinfort, and produced by the former. "Forgive Me" was released as the fourth single of the album in the United Kingdom on 3 November 2008. The single includes the  "Myself", written by and featuring vocals of American musician Novel.

In "Forgive Me", music critics compared Lewis's vocals with that of Whitney Houston and Mariah Carey. The music video was directed by Wayne Isham, and it was inspired by multiple Broadway musicals, including Carousel and West Side Story. "Forgive Me" reached number five on the British and Irish charts, thus becoming Lewis's fourth single to peak within the top ten in the UK. Additionally, it peaked atop the Slovakian Singles Chart and reached the top ten in Italy and Sweden.

Lewis promoted "Forgive Me" on some television shows, such as GMTV and The National Lottery Live, in the United Kingdom, as well as on the Italian television show Carràmba! Che sorpresa and on the Swedish talent show Idol. Also, the song was added to the setlists of her tours The Labyrinth (2010) and Glassheart (2013).

Background and composition

"Forgive Me" was written by Claude Kelly, Giorgio Tuinfort and Aliaune "Akon" Thiam, and produced by the latter. The single was published with one B-side, "Myself", written by Justin E. Boykin, Graham N. Marsh, Lewis and Alonzo "Novel" Stevenson.

"Forgive Me" is described as a "funky pop song", written in A minor. According to the sheet music published by Sony BMG, it moves at 120 beats per minute and is set in common time. On it, Lewis performs her highest pitch (G5) in falsetto during the final chorus, and her lowest pitch (A3) during each verse.

"Forgive Me" describes a female protagonist in a  relationship who leaves her boyfriend and eventually finds someone to reciprocate her love. Though she has found love from someone else, she defends herself and asks her  for forgiveness. In an interview with Digital Spy, Lewis explained why she decided to change her musical genre from her previous singles to a more upbeat one. She said: "I wanted to do something a bit different and the chance to work with Akon came about. I'm really pleased with how it's turned out and it's great that it's different, rather than what I always do." There are two versions of the song, the "album version" (3:40) and the "single mix" (3:24).

Release and promotion

On 26 July 2008, the single mix was released to the Mexican iTunes Store as a  digital single. For the UK release, the single cover was revealed on 17 September 2008, whilst the song was released in the UK on 3 November 2008 as the fourth single. Originally, the song was featured only in the North American version of the album Spirit, launched in April 2008. Later, "Forgive Me" was added in the deluxe edition of the album, which was released internationally in November 2008.

Lewis performed the song on the television programmes The National Lottery Live on 29 October 2008, and GMTV on 31 October 2008. Outside of the UK, she also performed the song on the Italian television show Carràmba! Che sorpresa and on the Swedish talent show Idol. In May 2010, the song was added to the setlist of her tour The Labyrinth, performed as the eighth song of the show. A live performance from The O2 Arena was included on the live album's DVD The Labyrinth Tour Live from The O2. In 2013, Lewis added "Forgive Me" to the setlist of her Glassheart Tour.

Critical reception
"Forgive Me" received generally positive reviews from music critics. CBBC's Newsround described "Forgive Me" as a danceable song. Gavin Martin of The Mirror gave the song three-out-of-five points and said, "[the song] showcases her voice of fire and honey. No apologies necessary". Nick Levine, Digital Spy music critic, gave the song a similar score, and compared it with Whitney Houston's song "I'm Your Baby Tonight". Levine added that after her previous three ballad singles, "it's a nice change". However, he also said the lyrics were implausible as "the adultery-theme [is a] poor match for the sweet, unassuming Hackney girl". Chad Grischow noted that with the song Lewis "will not go down as a glorified one-hit wonder". Stephen Thomas Erlewine described "Forgive Me" and another song from the album ("Misses Glass") as "just slightly glitzier than the rest of Spirit." Sal Cinquemani of Slant Magazine called the song "bouncy and youthful". Nate Chinen from The New York Times ironised with a "so what if she sound like a  Mariah".

Chart performance
"Forgive Me" debuted and peaked at number five in the United Kingdom on 15 November 2008, becoming Lewis's third single in debut within the top ten, after "A Moment Like This" and "Bleeding Love". In Ireland, before its official release as a single, it was the second highest debut of the week of the Irish Singles Chart, at number five. In the Slovak Airplay Chart, it debuted at number  and in its tenth week the song peaked at number one. In the Euro Digital Tracks the song reached the number 4. In Italy, "Forgive Me" debuted at number nine, but fell off the chart next week. Elsewhere in Europe, the song reached number seven in Sweden, twelve in Switzerland, and fifteen in both Austria and Germany. Later, "Forgive Me" dropped out of the chart, but on 10 November 2009, it re-entered at number fifty.

Music video

The music video for "Forgive Me" was directed by Wayne Isham, and edited by Nabil Mechi and Valentina Ganeva.

It starts out with Lewis receiving a text message from her boyfriend saying he is just a minute away from meeting up with her. The video then turns into a dream-like sequence with Lewis dancing in four  inspired by the Hollywood musicals West Side Story, The Rocky Horror Show, Singin' in the Rain and Carousel. The video ends with Lewis coming back to reality after a drop of rain lands on her hand as her boyfriend sends a message saying "Hurry! Looks like there could be rain".

Mark Savage from BBC News commented that Lewis does not dance in the video. Lewis replied, "I love dancing [...] but I am a singer and that is what I do".

Tracklisting and formats

German CD single / Switzerland CD maxi
 "Forgive Me" (single mix) – 3:24
 "Myself" feat. Novel – 3:50
 "Forgive Me" (video)

Promo CD single
 "Forgive Me" (single mix) – 3:24

Spirit (North American standard edition)
 "Forgive Me" – 3:40

Spirit – The Deluxe Edition
 "Forgive Me" – 3:40
 "Forgive Me" (UK version [video]) – 3:27

UK CD single
 "Forgive Me" (single mix) – 3:24
 "Myself" feat. Novel – 3:50

Credits and personnel

"Forgive Me"
Serban Ghenea: mixer
Mark Goodchild: recorder
John Hanes: Pro Tools engineer
Larry Jackson: vocal producers
Claude Kelly: vocal producers, writer
Leona Lewis: vocals, background vocals 
Trent Privat: recorder assistant
Tim Roberts: Pro Tools engineer assistant
Aliaune "Akon" Thiam: background vocals, producer, writer
Giorgio Tuinfort: , writer

"Myself"
Justin E. Boykin: acoustic guitar, writer
James Burch: cello
Matt Colette: drums, percussion
Everett James Harrell: piano, bells
Leona Lewis: vocals, background vocals, writer
Carlton Lynn: mixer, recorder
Graham Marsh: recorder, writer
Kimberly L. Smith: project coordinator
Alonzo "Novel" Stevenson: additional vocals, producer, writer

Charts

Weekly charts

Year-end charts

Release history

References

Bibliography

2008 singles
2008 songs
Leona Lewis songs
Music videos directed by Wayne Isham
Song recordings produced by Akon
Songs written by Akon
Songs written by Claude Kelly
Songs written by Giorgio Tuinfort
Syco Music singles